Reginald Jaffray Lucas (1865 – 9 May 1914) was a British historian and Conservative Party politician.

He was the son of Sir Thomas Lucas, 1st Baronet, decade at Eton and Trinity College, Cambridge.

He was private secretary to two Unionist Chief Whips,  Sir William Walrond, and Aretas Akers-Douglas. Then from 1900 to 1906 he was a Member of Parliament (MP) for Portsmouth.

After leaving the House of Commons he turned to writing.  His most-highly regarded work was 'George II and his Ministers', and he also published several novels.

After a painful illness of tuberculosis of the lungs, he committed suicide on 9 May 1914 at his home in London, by shooting himself with a revolver.

References

External links 
 

1865 births
1914 deaths
People educated at Eton College
Alumni of Trinity College, Cambridge
Conservative Party (UK) MPs for English constituencies
UK MPs 1900–1906
British politicians who committed suicide
Suicides by firearm in England
20th-century English historians
1914 suicides